Audrey Rigby (née Allen; born 17 September 1957) is a former association football player who represented New Zealand at international level.

Rigby made her Football Ferns as a substitute in a 0–0 draw with Australia on 28 November 1983, and finished her international career with 14 caps to her credit.

In 1972–73 Rigby was in England, playing for an early incarnation of Nottingham Forest Ladies.

References

1957 births
Living people
New Zealand women's international footballers
New Zealand women's association footballers
Women's association football defenders